= Mayan group =

Iran's largest private software development company

MAYAN Group ( گروه مایان )
- Type: Private
- Founded: Tehran, Iran (2001)
- Founder: Mahdi Jamshidi
- Headquarters: Iran, Iran
- Products: ERP Solution Mid-size business solutions Small business solutions CMS
- Website: https://mayannet.com/

MAYAN Group Co. MAYAN Group (Persian: گروه مایان) is Iran's largest private software development company. The company provides enterprise software solutions and support to businesses of all sizes located across the country.

== Activities ==
The company's core business activities focus on providing:

- ERP solutions for medium and large size enterprises
- Public Sector solutions
- Business Intelligence solutions
- Solutions for distribution and retail industries
- Solutions for SMEs
- Training, implementation and technical support of software systems
- Advanced RFID enabled solution
